MV Loch Riddon is a Caledonian Maritime Assets Limited ro-ro car ferry, built in 1986 and operated by Caledonian MacBrayne. After the first eleven years of her life in the Kyles of Bute, she served at Largs between 1997 and 2013. After a short spell as the Lismore vessel she returned to Largs in June 2014.

History
MV Loch Riddon was the third of four drive-through ferries built in the 1980s by Dunston's of Hessle, to cope with increasing traffic on CalMac's smaller routes.

Layout
They have a second passenger lounge, on the port side, reducing the capacity of the car deck to 12. The wheelhouse is painted red and given a black top, as she has no funnels as such.

Service
She spent 11 years rarely venturing from this crossing.

In 1997 Loch Riddon replaced her sister,  at Largs.

These two ships sailed together for 10 years until 2007 when the new  entered service displacing Loch Alainn. Loch Riddon replaced  as the full-time Lismore vessel for a short period of time before returning to the Largs service.

References

Caledonian MacBrayne
1986 ships